Stavros Paskaris (born August 31, 1984) is an American former ice hockey player. Paskaris attended Wayne State University where he played four years with the Wayne State Warriors men's ice hockey team which then competed in the NCAA's Division I College Hockey America (CHA) conference. In his final year (2007–08) Paskaris was named to the CHA First All-Star Team.

On July 6, 2020, Paskaris was named assistant coach for the Dartmouth College Big Green, rounding out new head coach Reid Cashman's inaugural staff.

Awards and honors

References

External links 

1984 births
American men's ice hockey forwards
Dayton Bombers players
Ice hockey players from Michigan
Living people
Wayne State Warriors men's ice hockey players